Michael Bacon (born December 22, 1949) is an American singer-songwriter, musician and film score composer. He is the older brother of actor Kevin Bacon. He is a faculty member in music at Lehman College.

Biography

Early life and career
Bacon, one of six children, was born in Philadelphia and raised there in a close-knit family. A former Park Avenue debutante, his mother, Ruth Hilda (née Holmes), taught elementary school and was a liberal activist, while his father, Edmund Bacon, was a well-respected urban planner and author of the canonical urban planning book, Design of Cities. Michael attended and graduated from the prestigious Central High School (Philadelphia), June 1965, 224th class. Much later he entered Lehman College and graduated with very high notes in 1995.

Music

Bacon is an accomplished guitarist, keyboardist and cellist. In the late 1990s and into the 2000s, Bacon performed with his Golden Globe and Screen Actors Guild Award-winning brother, Kevin, in a duo ensemble, called The Bacon Brothers, which he formed. With three albums to their credit by 2001, Bacon's tour schedule included eight concerts for the summer of that year, at venues from New York City, down the East Coast, and into the Midwest to Peru, Illinois and Missouri. The duo have written and performed songs together for several decades, including several commercial numbers and maintain that they will continue to work together and perform. The Bacon Brothers were featured on the July–August 2006 cover of Making Music Magazine.

In 2008, Bacon composed the soundtrack for the PBS mini series The Jewish Americans.

Film and television
Bacon has composed hundreds of songs for television shows and motion pictures.

In January 2006, Bacon appeared on an episode of Queer Eye with his brother Kevin. The episode featured him as the episode's "straight guy" and makeover recipient, and ended with both Bacon Brothers performing.

Personal life
Bacon has been married to Betsy Maguire-Bacon since 1972; they have one child, Neil Bacon (born April 29, 1982).  He earned a degree in music from Lehman College; he studied composition and orchestration with Pulitzer Prize-winning composer John Corigliano.

Discography

Solo
“Good News" Columbia

“Bringin’ it Home" Monument/CBS

“Love Song Believer" Monument/

With Kevin Bacon as the Bacon Brothers
1997: Forosoco
1999: Getting There
2001: Can't Complain
2005: White Knuckles
2009: New Years Day
2011: Philadelphia Road – The Best Of
2014: 36¢
2018: The Bacon Brothers
2020: The Way We Love

Film and television scores
Film
The Man Nobody Knew -feature dir. by Carl Colby
Boy Interrupted 2009 Sundance -dir. by Dana Perry
Red Betsy (with Sheldon Mirowitz) -feature dir. Chris Boebel
Loverboy -feature dir. By Kevin Bacon
Brothers in Arms – The Story of the Crew of Patrol Craft 94 feature doc. with John Kerry
Berga: Soldiers of Another War -Guggenheim Prods.
King Gimp −2000 Acad. Award Winner Short Documentary Bill Whiteford and Susan Hadary
D-Day Remembered 1995 Acad. Award Nominee Long Documentary Guggenheim Prods.
A Time for Justice 1995 Acad. Award Winner- Short Documentary- Guggenheim Prods.
Losing Chase starring Helen Mirren (Golden Globe winner) and Kyra Sedgwick dir. Kevin Bacon.
A Place in the Land 1998 Acad. Award Nominee Short Documentary Guggenheim Prods.
The Last Good Time  dir. Bob Balaban
Sleeping Together  dir. Hugh Bush
Shadow of Hate 1996 Acad. Award nominee- Guggenheim Productions
Pen Pals  dir, Mary Kotzke
Who Shot Pat? starring Sandra Bullock dir. Bob Brooks
In a Pig's Eye  starring David Canary dir. John Saffron
The Johnstown Flood 1993 Acad. Award winner Short Documentary- Guggenheim Prods.
Sharks of Treasure Island Cousteau Society
Network
Hiroshima, Rage and Betrayal, Pot of Gold -Peter Jennings ABC
Turning Point – ABC Series (17)
The Century -ABC (26)
Gettin' Over with Tony Danza ABC Series (9)
Tyson: The Fallen Champ 2 hour NBC Movie of the Week dir. Barbara Kopple
Trackdown ABC series (3)
Code One ABC Special
Brides ABC Special
We're Expecting ABC Special
America's Missing Children  CBS Special
Body Watching CBS special
Yearbook Fox series (11)
Urban Anxiety Fox series (9)
Public television
Finding Your Roots (2011–12)
The Buddha (2010)The Trials of J. Robert Oppenheimer (2009)The AdirondacksGeorge H. W. BushBill Moyers Journal (2007)Out of the ShadowsThe Mysterious Human Heart (2007)The Jewish Americans (2007)Oprah's Roots (2007)African American Lives I and II (2006) (2008)Victory in the Pacific (2005)RFK (2005)Marie Antoinette (2006)Religion and Ethics -themeDestination America (2005)Young Dr. Freud Emmy nominee for original scoreThe Windsors 4-hour mini-seriesDegenerate Art PBS (David Grubin)Napoleon 4-hour mini-seriesHOXIE: The First Stand (Peabody Award)Jim CrowAmerican Experience – WGBHSurrender in the Pacific (2005)The Kennedys  Emmy winner for Outstanding Achievement in Music, (News and Documentary)FDR  Peabody Award winnerAmelia EarhartLBJ National Emmy Nominee David Grubin Chicago Film Fest. Gold Plaque Award for MusicEisenhowerMacArthurLincolnAndrew CarnegieGold FeverTeddy Roosevelt (TR)The Last Boss (Daley)Orphan TrainsThe Wright StuffJourney to AmericaThe World That Moses BuiltThe Great Air RaceHurricane of 1938ReaganTruman (Emmy Winner)Alone on the Ice (Admiral Byrd)Dust BowlAmerica 1900 (Emmy winner, Peabody Award winner)Smithsonian WorldThe Wyeths (adaptation of Ann Wyeth McCoy’s music) Emmy winner 1988 (David Grubin)Voices of Latin AmericaBill Moyers on PBSHealing and the Mind 1993 National Emmy winner Inf. Series (5)Bill Moyers’ JournalIn Search of the ConstitutionA Second LookReport from PhiladelphiaThe Secret GovernmentGod and PoliticsWorld of IdeasPower of the WordNova -WGBHShackletonWorld in the BalanceIn Search of the Super TwisterThe Big DigTrillion Dollar BetElectric HeartRescue Mission in SpaceEclipse of the CenturyIn Search of the Lost LanguageRoller CoasterCondorsBuried in AshSick BuildingsMeteorsWNETTheme for The Musicals 1990 Emmy Best Director (John Merdin)America on WheelsCableThe Man who Loved Sharks (Nigel Noble) 1992 ACE Award Nominee-Best Original ScoreMarilyn: The Last Interview (HBO)LOCOMOTION Engines of Enterprise (BBC)Shoot the Clock LifetimeAddicted LifetimeMultiple Personality Disorder (HBO)Mitchum Ace Award Wombat ProductionsCNN: Special Assignment Theme
Rediscovering America with Roger Kennedy Discovery Series (11)
Sports Illustrated for Kids (HBO)
Drining Passion (TURNER)
Animal ER (TURNER)
The Hidden Zoo (TURNER)

References

External links

1949 births
American rock singers
American country singer-songwriters
American film score composers
American male film score composers
Lehman College alumni
Living people
Musicians from Philadelphia
Emmy Award winners
Columbia Records artists
Monument Records artists
Singer-songwriters from Pennsylvania
The Bacon Brothers members
Country musicians from Pennsylvania
Lehman College faculty
American male singer-songwriters